White friars are members of the Order of Carmelites.

Whitefriars may also refer to:

Related to Carmelites
 Whitefriars, Bristol, a former Carmelite friary in Bristol, England
 Whitefriars, Coventry, a former Carmelite friary in Coventry, England
 Whitefriars, London, an area in London named after the former Carmelite friary there
 Whitefriars, Gloucester, a former Carmelite friary in Gloucester, England
 Whitefriars, where the National Shrine of Saint Jude is based, in Faversham, Kent
 Ipswich Whitefriars, a former Carmelite friary in Ipswich, England
 Whitefriar Street Carmelite Church, a Roman Catholic church in Dublin, Ireland

Other
 Whitefriars Glass, a trade name of glass manufacturers James Powell and Sons of London, who had premises on the site of a Carmelite friary
 Whitefriars Theatre, a Jacobean London theatre
 Whitefriars College, a Roman Catholic college in Victoria, Australia
 Whitefriars Housing Group, a housing association in Coventry
 Whitefriars School, a school in London, England
 Whitefriars Shopping Centre, a shopping centre in Canterbury, England
 Whitefriars, 333 High Street, Lincoln, a listed building in Lincoln, England
Whitefriars, or, The Days of Charles the Second: an Historical Romance, an 1844 novel published anonymously by Emma Robinson (author)